Stowaway is a 1936 American musical drama film directed by William A. Seiter. The screenplay by William M. Conselman, Nat Perrin, and Arthur Sheekman is based on a story by Samuel G. Engel. The film is about a young orphan called "Ching Ching" (Shirley Temple) who meets wealthy playboy Tommy Randall (Robert Young) in Shanghai and then accidentally stows away on the ocean liner he is travelling on. The film was hugely successful, and is available on videocassette and DVD.

Plot
Young orphan Barbara "Ching-Ching" Stewart lives in Sanchow, China. When bandits threaten the village, she is sent to Shanghai for safety. Accidentally separated from her guide, Ching-Ching finds herself alone in Shanghai with her dog, Mr Wu. She meets Tommy Randall, a rich American playboy traveling about the world by ocean liner. Tommy leaves Ching-Ching in his convertible car while he goes into a hotel to see several friends. When Tommy returns, it appears Ching-Ching is gone, though she actually crawled into the car's trunk when it started raining and has fallen asleep. Tommy's car is loaded into the ship's cargo hold and Ching-Ching accidentally becomes a stowaway. When discovered, Tommy provides for her, helped by Susan Parker, a beautiful young woman traveling aboard the ship with her future mother-in-law, Mrs Hope. They are headed to Bangkok where Susan is to marry her fiancé, Richard Hope, who works there. As Susan and Tommy grow attracted to one another during the voyage, Ching-Ching plays Cupid to ignite a romance. Mrs Hope, alarmed over Susan's attachment to Tommy, telegrams Richard to meet them at the next port.

Tommy and Susan learn Ching-Ching is to disembark at the next port and sent to an orphanage in Shanghai after it is learned her missionary guardians were killed in the village attack. Tommy wants to adopt Ching-Ching but, being a bachelor, cannot. He asks Susan to adopt Ching Ching when she marries Richard and only until he can himself marry and then adopt the child. However, Susan has ended her engagement over Richard's selfish nature and his overbearing mother's constant interference. She agrees to marry Tommy in name only so they can adopt Ching-Ching. They agree to divorce upon returning to the US, giving Tommy custody. During the court proceedings, they realize they love each other and remain married and adopt Ching-Ching.

Cast
 Shirley Temple as Barbara "Ching-Ching" Stewart, a young American girl orphaned in China
 Robert Young as Tommy Randall, a playboy and world traveler who wants to adopt Barbara
 Alice Faye as Susan Parker, who is engaged Mrs Hope's son, Richard
 Helen Westley as Mrs Hope, Richard's mother and Susan's future mother-in-law
 Allan Lane as Richard Hope, the son of Mrs. Hope and Susan's fiancé
 Eugene Pallette as the Colonel, Tommy's friend
 Astrid Allwyn as Kay Swift, Tommy's friend
 Jayne Regan as Dora Day, Tommy's friend
 Arthur Treacher as Atkins, Tommy's valet
 Philip Ahn as Sun Lo, Barbara's friend in Sanchow
 Willie Fung as Chang, Sun-lo's friend and a boatman
 Robert Greig as Captain of SS Victoria
 J. Edward Bromberg as Judge J. D. Booth
 Layne Tom Jr. as Chinese Boy in the Musical Band (uncredited)

Production
Temple learned forty words in Mandarin Chinese for the film, later stating the learning process required six months of instruction. She was taught by UCLA student Bessie Nyi. She encountered problems in her communication with the extras on the set, however, as she found out they were actually speaking a south Chinese dialect. In the film, she impersonates Ginger Rogers (with a life-sized Fred Astaire doll fixed to her toes), Eddie Cantor, and Al Jolson singing “Mammy”. In the first take, the elastic band of the dummy, which she named Tommy Wonder, snapped off her foot. In preparation for the Jolson imitation, she had to listen and watch Jolson, something she did not enjoy doing.

Production of the movie was held up for close to four weeks while first Alice Faye then Shirley Temple came down with the flu.

The dog in the film, a miniature Chinese Pekinese which was owned by the wife of a local photographer, was given to Temple and renamed Ching-Ching (after her character in the movie). Temple's mother worked out a trade in which Temple and her father would agree to pose for the photographer in exchange for the dog.

Temple’s IQ was tested during the Stowaway period and found to be 155, the genius classification.

Critical reception
Variety remarked, “It’s a nifty Shirley Temple comedy with musical trimmings.” Variety commented, “Whether or not due to Seiter’s efforts, [Shirley] does not appear to have outgrown […] the Little Miss Marker stage in this one as she had in her last pictures”.

The New York Times applauded the film, noting that Temple had “an amusing script behind her, an agreeable adult troupe with her, and a clever director before her.” The reviewer thought the film the best from Temple since Little Miss Marker.

See also
 Shirley Temple filmography

Notes

References

External links
 
 
 
 

1936 films
American black-and-white films
Films about orphans
Films directed by William A. Seiter
Films set in China
Films set on ships
20th Century Fox films
1936 musical films
American musical films
1930s American films